Henry William Parks (18 July 1906 – 7 May 1984) was an English cricketer. He was a right-handed batsman whose first-class career with Sussex lasted from 1926 to 1948. In 483 matches he scored 21,725 runs at an average of 33.57, with 42 centuries and a highest score of 200* . He scored 1000 runs in a season 14 times, with a best of 2,122 in 1947. Before World War Two he was a middle-order batsman, but after it he became John Langridge's opening partner.

He was a member of a notable cricketing family, being the brother of Jim Parks senior and the uncle of Jim Parks junior. He stood as a first-class umpire in 1949 and 1950, and played one match for the Commonwealth XI in India in 1949–50, his last first-class match.  Afterwards he was a coach at Taunton School.

External links 
 
 Wisden obituary

1906 births
1984 deaths
English cricket umpires
English cricket coaches
English cricketers
People from Haywards Heath
Sussex cricketers
Commonwealth XI cricketers
Players cricketers
English cricketers of 1919 to 1945
Marylebone Cricket Club Australian Touring Team cricketers